This is a list of members of the South Australian House of Assembly from 1970 to 1973, as elected at the 1970 state election:

 The Labor member for Adelaide, Sam Lawn, died on 25 May 1971. Labor candidate Jack Wright won the resulting by-election on 3 July 1971.

Members of South Australian parliaments by term
20th-century Australian politicians